Sunrise Beach is a summer village in Alberta, Canada. It is located on the western shore of Sandy Lake, south of Sandy Beach.

Demographics 

In the 2016 Census of Population conducted by Statistics Canada, the Summer Village of Sunrise Beach had a population of 135 living in 69 of its 139 total private dwellings, a  change from its 2011 population of 149.

See also 
List of communities in Alberta
List of summer villages in Alberta
List of resort villages in Saskatchewan

References

External links 

1988 establishments in Alberta
Lac Ste. Anne County
Summer villages in Alberta